Franz Köhler (18 March 1901 – 20 April 1982) was an Austrian football manager and former player. He managed the Icelandic national team from 1953 to 1954.

He also coached Bulgaria, Eintracht Osnabrück and Go Ahead Eagles.

References

1901 births
1982 deaths
Austrian football managers
Austrian footballers
SK Rapid Wien players
Austria international footballers
Austrian expatriate football managers
Expatriate football managers in Bulgaria
Bulgaria national football team managers
Expatriate football managers in Iceland
Iceland national football team managers
Go Ahead Eagles managers
Association football goalkeepers